Vaudreuil-Soulanges was a provincial electoral district in the Montérégie region of Quebec, Canada.

It was created for the 1939 election from parts of Vaudreuil and Soulanges electoral districts.  Its final election was in 1985.  It disappeared in the 1989 election and its successor electoral districts were the re-created Vaudreuil and the newly created Salaberry-Soulanges.

Members of the Legislative Assembly / National Assembly

Election results

References
 Election results (National Assembly)
 Election results (QuebecPolitique)

Vaudreuil-Soulanges